Białuń may refer to the following places:
Białuń, Pomeranian Voivodeship (north Poland)
Białuń, Goleniów County in West Pomeranian Voivodeship (north-west Poland)
Białuń, Stargard County in West Pomeranian Voivodeship (north-west Poland)